Skyler Elizabeth Day (born August 2, 1991) is an American actress and singer. She is best known for her recurring roles as Maggie Ritter on the TeenNick series Gigantic and as Amy Ellis on the NBC series Parenthood.

Life and career 
Day was born in Cumming, Georgia. She started participating in gymnastics and modeling at an early age. She was then discovered by a talent agent as a result of a chance encounter at the DMV. In 2003, she co-starred in the Atlanta-based short film A Perilous Dance: The Damon DeRivers Story. In 2004, she and her family moved to French Valley, California, to pursue a career in the entertainment industry.

For many months, she auditioned for television pilots and took jobs doing radio voice-overs and television commercials. In 2003, she was cast in the titular role in the independent film The Adventures of Ociee Nash opposite Keith Carradine and Mare Winningham. From 2004 to 2008, she co-starred in numerous television films and short independent films before guest starring in a 2009 episode of iCarly. Her other television credits include Southland, Drop Dead Diva, The Whole Truth, Days of Our Lives, Law & Order: LA, Sonny with a Chance, CSI: Miami and Good Luck Charlie. In 2010, she had a recurring role in the TeenNick series Gigantic. The series ended the following year after one season. In 2011, she landed the role of Amy Ellis on the NBC series Parenthood.

Besides acting, Day is also an aspiring country music singer. Growing up she took classes in musical theater, acting and songwriting. Much of her music can be found on her official YouTube account.

On October 26, 2014, Day released her debut EP Between the I and the You. The album contained five songs. On August 1, 2017, Skyler released her second EP Los Angeles, which consists of six songs.

Personal life 
Day was homeschooled after second grade. She has an older sister, Savannah, and a twin brother who is also an actor and singer, Dalton Day. All three have competed in gymnastics and cheerleading. Her parents, David and Kelly, were also gymnasts and owned a gym in Norcross, Georgia. Her father now works as a recruiter in the construction field. She and her family are committed Christians.

Day started dating actor Ian Nelson in January 2013. She wrote a song called "Ian's Song" for Nelson which is included on her EP. On November 26, 2015, during their trip to Italy, Nelson proposed to Day in Cortona. In a live stream on YouTube celebrating her music video release for "Ian's Song" on September 10, 2016, Skyler said that after the proposal, she wrote another song about Ian called "Mine Sweet Mine", which she performed during the live show. Day and Nelson married in Camarillo, California on September 30, 2017.

Filmography

Discography
EP
 Between the I and the You (2014, Skyler Day)
 Los Angeles (2017, Skyler Day)

References

External links

1991 births
Living people
21st-century American actresses
Actresses from Georgia (U.S. state)
American child actresses
American child singers
American film actresses
American Internet celebrities
American television actresses
Fraternal twin actresses
People from Cumming, Georgia
American twins
People from Riverside County, California
21st-century American singers
21st-century American women singers